Joe Parker is the athletic director at Colorado State University.

College
Parker attended the University of Michigan where he was a three-time All-American swimmer, earning a bachelor's degree in economics. He later earned a master's degree in business administration from Texas.

Career
At Texas, Parker began his in career in the athletic department as a development manager. He also worked at Washington State, Oklahoma, as the deputy athletic director at Texas Tech, and as senior associate A.D. at Michigan.

Parker became athletic director at Colorado State University on March 17, 2015, as the permanent replacement of Jack Graham following a national search.

Family
Parker and wife Jen are parents to two children, Emma and Will.

See also
List of NCAA Division I athletic directors

References

External links
 Colorado State profile

 

Living people
Michigan Wolverines men's swimmers
University of Texas alumni
Colorado State Rams athletic directors
Year of birth missing (living people)